Philippus Innemee (4 December 1902 – 10 September 1963) was a Dutch cyclist. He competed in two events at the 1924 Summer Olympics.

See also
 List of Dutch Olympic cyclists

References

External links
 

1902 births
1963 deaths
Dutch male cyclists
Olympic cyclists of the Netherlands
Cyclists at the 1924 Summer Olympics
Cyclists from The Hague